The Minardi M195 was a Formula One car designed by Aldo Costa for the Minardi team. The original M195 was used in the 1995 Formula One World Championship while an updated version, the M195B, was used in the  Championship. Both versions were powered by the Ford ED 3-litre V8 engine. Across its two seasons of racing the car was driven by Italians Pierluigi Martini, Luca Badoer, Giancarlo Fisichella and Giovanni Lavaggi, Portuguese Pedro Lamy and Brazilian Tarso Marques.

Mugen-Honda legal case 
The M195 had been designed to fit a Mugen-Honda engine, as Minardi had been expecting to run Mugen-Honda engines during the 1995 season. A last-minute decision from Mugen to supply Ligier left Minardi struggling to adapt their car to take a Ford Motor Company ED engine. Giancarlo Minardi, the team's owner, threatened legal action over the affair. Minardi stated, "We are very proud because we have had to design two different cars in the time normally needed to do just one. There was an agreement with Mugen Co. Ltd. but this was not respected."

Minardi won the lawsuit, but damages were not awarded. The court ruled that the deal between Minardi and Mugen was "reaching a point of mutual agreement so that it was legitimate to expect that the contract would have been effectively concluded." Minardi appealed the absence of damages and in a counter-move, Flavio Briatore (Ligier's owner at the time) had Minardi's equipment seized at the French Grand Prix due to Minardi owing one of his companies money for their engine deal from 1993. The matter was settled out of court. The money Minardi owed was forgotten and Briatore paid $1 million to Minardi to compensate them for the loss of the Mugen-Honda engines.

Minardi M195B 

Pedro Lamy took seat 20; Giancarlo Fisichella, then Tarso Marques, and finally Giovanni Lavaggi took seat 21. The M195B scored no championship points.

Livery 
The M195 and the M195B had a black and white colour scheme, with fluorescent green painted wings from major sponsors Doimo and Valleverde.

Complete Formula One results
(key)

References

External links

1995 Formula One season cars
1996 Formula One season cars
Minardi Formula One cars